Joe is a British children's TV series written by Alison Prince, first broadcast in 1966 as part of the Watch With Mother slot. The eponymous Joe was the young son of a couple who ran a motel; in later episodes the family had moved to the seaside, where they ran a holiday hotel. The show was produced by Q3 London.

Books based on the series include Joe and the Nursery School and Joe Moves House, written with Joan Hickson.

Episodes

Series One
Joe and a Horse (3 October 1966)
Joe and the Flags (10 October 1966)
Joe and the Ice Lorry (17 October 1966)
Joe and the Flowers (24 October 1966)
Joe's Rainy Day (31 October 1966)
Joe and the Goulash (7 November 1966)
Joe and Abel (14 November 1966)
Joe and the Sheep (21 November 1966)
Joe and the Market (28 November 1966)
Joe and the Fog (5 December 1966)
Joe and the Marbles (12 December 1966)
Joe and the Dustcart (19 December 1966)
Joe and the Football (26 December 1966)

Series Two
Joe Moves House (23 February 1971)
The Big Family (2 March 1971)
Joe and the Pram (9 March 1971)
Joe and the Painter (16 March 1971)
Joe and the Baby (23 March 1971)
The Busy Breakfast (30 March 1971)
Joe and the Shop (6 April 1971)
Joe and the Snow (13 April 1971)
Joe and the Garden (20 April 1971)
Joe and the Donkey (27 April 1971)
Joe and the Plumber (4 May 1971)
Joe and the Big Hill (11 May 1971)
Joe and the Nursery (18 May 1971)

References

1960s British children's television series
BBC children's television shows